This list covers television programs whose first letter (excluding "the") of the title are Q and R.

Q

QA
Q&A (Australia)
Q&A (US)

QE
Q.E.D. (UK)
Q.E.D. (US)

QF 

 Q-Force

QI
QI

QU
Quack Pack
Quadratics
Quantico
Quantum Leap
Quark
Quatermass
The Quatermass Experiment
Queen America
Queen Bees
Queen for a Day
The Queen Latifah Show
Queen of the Office (South Korea)
Queenie's Castle
Queen of the South
Queen Sugar
Queen of Swords
Queer as Folk (UK)
Queer as Folk (US)
Queer Duck
Queer Eye (2003)
Queer Eye (2018)
Queer Eye for the Straight Girl
Que Locura (Venezuela)
A Question Of Sport (BBC)
Question Time (BBC topical Debate)
Quick Before They Catch Us
Quick Draw McGraw
Quick Fix Meals with Robin Miller
Quill Awards
Quiller
Quincy, M.E.
Quints by Surprise
Quintuplets
Quiz Kids Challenge
Quiznation (UK)
Quiznation (US)
Qumi-Qumi (Russia)

R

RA
Rabbids Invasion
The Raccoons
Rachael Ray
Rachael vs. Guy: Celebrity Cook-Off
Rachael Ray's Kids Cook-Off
Rachael Ray's Tasty Travels
The Rachel Zoe Project
Rab C. Nesbitt
Racing Wives
Radio Active
Radio Free Roscoe
Rag, Tag and Bobtail (British)
Rage of Bahamut: Manaria Friends 
Rainbow Rangers 
Rainbow Ruby 
Raising Hope
Raising the Bar
Raising Whitley
Ramar of the Jungle
Ramsay's Kitchen Nightmares (UK)
The Ranch
Randall and Hopkirk (Deceased) (1969)
Randall and Hopkirk (2000)
Random! Cartoons
Randy Cunningham: 9th Grade Ninja
Randy to the Rescue
Ranger Rob
The Rap Game
Rated A for Awesome
The Rat Patrol
Ratz
Raven's Home
Ravenswood
Rawhide
Ray Donovan

=em
Reading Rainbow
Ready Jet Go!
Ready for Love
Ready or Not (Canada)
The Real
The Real Adventures of Jonny Quest
Real Chance of Love
Real and Chance: The Legend Hunters
The Real Ghostbusters
The Real Housewives
Les Vraies Housewives (France) 
The Real Housewives of Athens
The Real Housewives of Atlanta
The Real Housewives of Auckland
The Real Housewives of Beverly Hills
The Real Housewives of Cheshire 
The Real Housewives of Dallas
The Real Housewives of D.C.
The Real Housewives of Melbourne 
The Real Housewives of Miami
The Real Housewives of New Jersey
The Real Housewives of New York City
The Real Housewives of Orange County
The Real Housewives of Potomac
The Real Housewives of Salt Lake City
The Real Housewives of Sydney 
The Real Housewives of Toronto
The Real Housewives of Vancouver
Real Husbands of Hollywood
The Real L Word
The Real McCoy
The Real McCoys
The Real O'Neals
Reality Racing
Real People
Real Sports with Bryant Gumbel
The Real Story
Real Time with Bill Maher
The Real World
The Really Loud House
Really Me!
Reaper
Reba
Rebound
The Rebel
The Rebel Billionaire: Branson's Quest for the Best
Rebelde Way
ReBoot
Reborn!
Recess
Recipe for Deception
Red Band Society
Red Dwarf
Red Eye w/Greg Gutfeld
The Red Green Show
The Red Line
Redneck Island
The Red Skelton Show
Red Table Talk
Red vs. Blue
Redakai
Redwall
Reef Break
Regal Academy
Regular Show
Rehab Addict
Reign
Rel
Reliable Sources
Relic Hunter
Remington Steele
Remodeled
Remote Control
Remy & Boo
Renegade
The Renegades
Ren & Stimpy "Adult Party Cartoon"
The Ren & Stimpy Show
Reno 911!
Rentaghost
The Replacements
Rescue 8
Rescue Heroes
Rescue Me (US)
Rescue Me (UK)
Rescue 911
The Resident
The Restaurant (Ireland)
The Restaurant (UK)
The Restaurant (US)
Restaurant: Impossible
The Restless Years
Retired at 35
The Return of Jezebel James
Return of the Mac
Return to Peyton Place
Reunion
Rev.
Revenge
Revenge Body with Khloé Kardashian
Revolution

RH
Rhett and Link's Buddy System
Rhoda

RI
Rich Girls
Rich Kids of Beverly Hills
The Rich List
Rich Man, Poor Man
Rich Man, Poor Man Book II
Richard Diamond, Private Detective
The Riches
Richie Rich (1980)
Richie Rich (1996)
Rick and Morty
Rick Mercer Report
Ricky Sprocket: Showbiz Boy
Ricki Lake
The Ricki Lake Show
Ricky Zoom
Ride
Ridiculousness
Ridley Jones
The Rifleman
Right This Minute
Ringer
Ring of Honor Wrestling
Rin Tin Tin K-9 Cop
Ripper Street
Ripping Yarns
Riptide (American)
Riptide (Australian)
Rise (Canada)
Rise (US)
The Rise of Phoenixes (China)
Rise of the Teenage Mutant Ninja Turtles
River (British)
The River (UK)
The River (US)
River Cottage
Riverdale (Canada)
Riverdale (US)
River Monsters
Rizzoli & Isles

RL 

 R.L. Stine's The Haunting Hour: The Series

RO
Road to Avonlea
Road Rules
Roadtrip Nation
The Roaring 20's
Roary the Racing Car
Rob & Big
Rob & Chyna
Rob Dyrdek's Fantasy Factory
Rob the Robot
Robert Montgomery Presents
Robin Hood (2006)
Robinson Crusoe
Robin's Nest
Robo Cop The Animated Series
RoboRoach (Canada)
Robot Chicken
Robotboy
Robot Girls Z
Rock of Love with Bret Michaels
Rock of Love Bus with Bret Michaels
Rock of Love: Charm School
Rock Profile (UK)
Rock & Roll Jeopardy!
Rock Star
Rocket Power
Rocket Robin Hood
The Rocketeer
The Rockford Files
Rocko's Modern Life
The Rocky and Bullwinkle Show
Rocky King detective
Roger Ramjet
 Roll Out
Rome
Romeo!
The Rookie
Rookie Blue
The Rookies
Rookies
Roobarb (British)
Room 101 (British)
Room 222
Room Raiders
Roots
Roots: The Next Generations
The Ropers
Ros na Rún
Roseanne
Rosemary and Thyme
The Rosie O'Donnell Show
The Rosie Show
Roswell
Roswell, New Mexico
Roundhouse
Route 66
Rowan & Martin's Laugh-In
Roy
The Roy Rogers Show
The Royal
Royal Canadian Air Farce
Royal Pains
The Royals
Royle Family

RU
Rubbadubbers (UK) 
Rubik the Amazing Cube
Ruby Gloom (Canada)
Ruff and Reddy
Ruff-Ruff, Tweet and Dave
Rugby Special
Rugrats
Rules of Engagement
Run's House
Run for Your Life
Run Joe Run
Run of the House
Runaway (UK)
Runaway (US)
Runaways
Running Wilde
Running Wild with Bear Grylls
The RuPaul Show
RuPaul's Drag Race
RuPaul's Drag Race: All Stars
RuPaul's Drag U
Rupert
Rurouni Kenshin (Japan)
Rush
Russian Doll
Russian Roulette
Rustic Rehab
Rusty Rivets

RW 

 RWBY
 RWBY Chibi

RY
Ryan (Australia)
Ryan and Tatum: The O'Neals
Ryan's Hope
Ryan's Mystery Playdate

Previous:  List of television programs: P    Next:  List of television programs: S